The Inaugural Women's European Amateur Boxing Championships were held in Saint-Amand-les-Eaux, France from April 10 to 14, 2001. This competition was organised by the European governing body for amateur boxing, EABA. 78 fighters from 14 European countries competed in 11 weight classes.

Russia dominated the competition, winning 6 gold medals; host country France were second in the medals table.

Medal table

Medal winners

References

European Amateur Boxing Championships
European Amateur Boxing Championships
Women's European Amateur Boxing Championships
International boxing competitions hosted by France
Women's European Amateur Boxing Championships